The Cellvibrionales are an order of Gammaproteobacteria.

References

Gammaproteobacteria
Bacteria orders